This is a list of protests in North Dakota related to the murder of George Floyd.

Locations

Bismarck 
Hundreds gathered to share solidarity for the life of George Floyd at Peace Park on May 30. A witness said she saw the passenger of a pickup truck displaying a Confederate Flag and Trump 2020 regalia point a gun at the protesters.

Dickinson 
Hundreds of protesters gathered along Third Avenue on June 2 to protest for justice for George Floyd and equality in the judicial system.

Fargo 
Black Lives Matter protesters marched from Island Park past the Police Station and then south on 25th Street, as reported on May 30. The protests began peacefully but became violent after 6:00 PM. Several businesses in downtown Fargo were damaged, including the historic Hotel Donaldson. Nearby Moorhead, Minnesota's African-American Mayor Johnathan Judd pressed the flesh in the crowd of thousands asking people to get more involved in their community.

Grand Forks 
Hundreds of protesters marched though downtown Grand Forks on June 4, in honor of George Floyd.

Jamestown 
On June 5, approximately 20 protesters held a rally on First Avenue to protest the murder of George Floyd, chanting slogans such as "Hands up, don't shoot."

Minot 
On May 31, over 100 protesters gathered at Oak Park to rally against police brutality.

Rugby 
On June 7, almost 50 high school students were escorted by police officers as they peacefully marched through the streets of Rugby to protest the murder of George Floyd.

Valley City 
On June 7, between 70 and 85 protesters gathered in Valley City Park and marched across the bridge and through the streets in support of Black Lives Matter.

Williston 
On June 5, about 30 protesters gathered at Harmon Park to support Black Lives Matter and rally against police brutality. A biker gang held a counter-protest across from them, brandishing firearms and chanting "All Lives Matter."

References 

North Dakota
2020 in North Dakota
Events in North Dakota
Riots and civil disorder in North Dakota
May 2020 events in the United States
June 2020 events in the United States